Béal na Bláth or Béal na Blá (anglicised Bealnablath or Bealnabla) is a small village on the R585 road in County Cork, Ireland. The area is best known as the site of the ambush and death of the Irish revolutionary leader Michael Collins in 1922.

Michael Collins
On 22 August 1922, during the Irish Civil War, Michael Collins, Chairman of the Provisional Government and Commander-in-chief of the National Army, was killed in an ambush near Béal na Bláth by anti-treaty IRA forces while travelling in convoy from Bandon. The ambush was planned in a farmhouse in the village close to The Diamond Bar. Commemorations are held on the nearest Sunday to the anniversary of his death. A memorial cross (coordinates ) stands 1 km south of the village, at the site of the shooting in the townland of Glannarogue, on a local road which was a dirt road when Collins was shot. A small white pillar marked with a cross, located just to the right of the steps, marks the exact spot where he fell.

Name
The original version of the name has become obscured with the passage of time. The two anglicisations are 'Bealnabla' and 'Bealnablath'.  means "mouth/opening/approach".

The spelling  (meaning "mouth of the flowers") is commonly used but does not fit with the pronunciation used by the last native Irish-language speakers in the area (who survived until the 1940s), nor does it accord with the historical record. This spelling of the name, and the associated translation, most likely arose through folk etymology among non-native speakers.

References

Towns and villages in County Cork